The Best of Jo Jo Zep & The Falcons (subtitled I'm in a Dancing Mood) is a greatest hits album by Australian Blues, rock and R&B group, Jo Jo Zep & The Falcons. It was released in July 2007 to coincide with announcement of the group's ARIA Hall of Fame induction.

Background and release
In 1975, Joe Camilleri joined Wayne Burt, Jeff Burstin, John Power and Gary Young to record a version of "Run Rudolph Run" as a Christmas single produced by Ross Wilson. After recording the albums Don't Waste It, Whip It Out, Live!! Loud and Clear and So Young for Oz Records, the band found themselves at Mushroom Records. Wayne Burt had left and replaced by Tony Faehse, Wilbur Wilde also joined the band. The label move and producer Peter Solley oversaw the hit singles "Hit & Run", "Shape I'm In" and "All I Wanna Do" and the albums Screaming Targets, Hats Off Step Lively and (Dexterity. The band toured overseas and even got to play at the Montreux Jazz Festival. Cha was released simply as Jo Jo Zep, and the band officially broke up in 1984.

Track listing

Release history

References

2007 greatest hits albums
Jo Jo Zep & The Falcons albums
Compilation albums by Australian artists